Pistolstræde is a passageway in the Old Town of Copenhagen, Denmark, linking the Østergade-section of the pedestrianized shopping street Strøget with Ny Østergade. It widens into a small plaza to the north and is entered through a gateway at each end. The name Pistolstræde (Pistol Alley) refers to its L-shape. its wider northern section being the "grip" of the pistol.

History
Pistolstræde is the last of a number of similar alleys in the area. It was originally connected to another one, Peder Madsens Gang, which was replaced by Ny Østergade in 1873.

Public art
The Magpie Fountain, created by Gunnar Westman, was installed at the small plaza in 1980. It features a stylized sculpture of a common magpie sitting on a pole. Its beak sprays water into a wooden cask.

References

External links
 Pistolstræde at indenforvoldene.dk

Streets in Copenhagen